Han Song (born 19 August 1947) is a professor of Gangneung-Wonju National University in the department of dentistry. He also served as the university's president from 2003 to July 2011.

References

 

1947 births
Living people
Presidents of universities and colleges in South Korea
South Korean dentists
Academic staff of Gangneung–Wonju National University
Presidents of Gangneung–Wonju National University
University of Connecticut alumni
Seoul National University alumni